Corbicula leana, known as chamjaecheop ("true jaecheop") in Korean and as mashijimi ("true shijimi") in Japanese, is a species of freshwater and brackish water clams, distributed in the Korean Peninsula and the Japanese archipelago.

Culinary use 
In Korean cuisine, Corbicula leana are used in a clam soup known as jaecheop-guk.

References 

Molluscs described in 1867
Cyrenidae
Korean seafood
Molluscs of the Pacific Ocean